St Bede's College is a private Roman Catholic co-educational day school for pupils between 3 and 18 years located on Alexandra Road South in Whalley Range, Manchester, England.  It is a member of the Headmasters' and Headmistresses' Conference.

Originally founded in 1876 in All Saints, Manchester as a Commercial College by the Bishop of Salford, Herbert Vaughan, the College moved to its present site on Alexandra Park Road in 1877 and in 1891 became the Diocesan Junior Seminary. The College is no longer operated by the Diocese of Salford and is today an independent charitable trust run by a board of trustees.

History

The original school was at 16 Devonshire Street, Grosvenor Square, off Oxford Road (then called Oxford Street) and was set up in 1876 by the then Bishop of Salford, Herbert Vaughan, later Cardinal Archbishop of Westminster. Originally, the school was conceived as a "commercial school" to prepare the sons of Manchester Catholics for a life in business and the professions.

This was the first school under the patronage of Saint Bede. In August 1877, the Manchester Aquarium on Alexandra Road South and the plot of land around it was purchased by the then Bishop Vaughan for College purposes. On 10 September 1877, St Bede's College re-opened in the Manchester Aquarium with 45 pupils who were taught by 11 staff, 8 of them priests. The faculty lived in 'Rose Lawn', until the accommodation levels were completed in the Vaughan Building, for both clergy and a large number of boarders. The somewhat spartan conditions were alleviated by a team of long-serving nuns, who took care of the domestic and catering requirements, as well as a number of lay staff.

In the late 1870s and early 1880s, the Vaughan building was constructed (see pictures). The original plan was for a symmetrical building, with five-storey towers at each end. Only one half of this design was ever carried out, but the main ground floor corridor of the Vaughan building is an impressive centrepiece for the school all the same. An imposing entrance on Alexandra Road (decorated with ceramic mouldings by Tinworth) leads into a corridor adorned with mosaics and marble. The original aquarium building (now the school's Academic Hall) leads off the main corridor directly opposite the main entrance. Appropriately the decorative scheme includes plaster mouldings of fish and other marine animals.

In 1891, Salford Catholic Grammar School (the Diocesan Junior seminary) amalgamated with the College which duly became the place where over 500 priests, some of whom later became bishops or archbishops, were educated.

The College Chapel was built in 1898 and the Henshaw Building, named after the fifth Bishop of Salford, was opened around 1932. The Beck Building, named after the seventh Bishop of Salford George Andrew Beck, was opened in 1958 while the St Regis Building, built in the first decade of the 20th century as a retreat house for the Cenacle Convent, was bought by the College in 1970. It remained empty until 1984 when the Governors took the decision to make St Bede's co-educational. Over the next three years, the St Regis building was completely renovated and allowed the College roll to increase from 630 at the beginning of the 1980s to just under 1000 today.
 
Between 1886 and 1896, the College had an affiliate school [a 'realgymnasium'] at Bonn, Germany, then a small town on the Rhine. It was never successful. British victims of the war are commemorated in the College Chapel.

From the time of the school's move to Alexandra Road, the College supported the nearby St Bede's Mission, and priests on the school's staff worked to provide for the spiritual needs of the Catholic population in Whalley Range. In 1893 the Bishop of Salford, John Bilsborrow, appointed Father James Rowan, a former teacher at the college, as priest in charge of the district. The new English Martyrs Parish Church was consecrated on the Feast of the English Martyrs, 4 May 1922.

Today

The school admits children from Roman Catholic and non-Catholic families. Pupils perform well at GCSE and A-level.

The College continues to grow and each year the college admits no more than 100 pupils into year 7 (Upper 3rd).

The St Bede's College Educational Trust attempts to maintain a broad social mix, despite the end of the Assisted Places Scheme, by providing means-tested bursaries.

Members of the Manchester City Academy are guaranteed a place at the school, funded by the club.

School publications
Baeda is the school's annual publication and reviews the academic, sporting and other events within the school. It was first published at Michaelmas 1896. It chronicles the achievements of pupils and publishes works of arts, poetry and prose, as well as tales from ex-pupils. Although the editor is a member of staff, it is largely contributed to by pupils. Its name is the school's patron saint's name in Latin.

Notable alumni

Alumni of the school, led by the games master and former Sale player Des Pastore MBE, founded the Old Bedians Rugby union Football Club in Chorltonville in 1954.

Musicians

 Clint Boon – musician and DJ
 Arthur Catterall – classical musician
 Rob Gretton – manager of Joy Division and New Order
 Mike Harding – folk singer and DJ
Stephen Hough – concert pianist
 Nicholas Kenyon – BBC Proms controller
 John Maher – drummer, Buzzcocks
 Peter Noone – singer, Herman's Hermits

Actors, television personalities, writers and journalists

 Colin Baker – actor, the Sixth Doctor in Doctor Who
 Terry Christian – radio and TV presenter
 Ed Docx – writer and broadcaster
 Trevor Griffiths – dramatist
 Toby Harnden – journalist and writer
 Ceallach Spellman – actor, Waterloo Road
 Nina Warhurst - journalist and broadcaster, BBC Breakfast

Clergy

 Geoffrey Burke – Auxiliary Bishop of Salford
 Robert Byrne – Auxiliary Bishop of Birmingham
 George Patrick Dwyer – Archbishop of Birmingham
 Thomas McMahon – Bishop of Brentwood
 John Francis McNulty – Bishop of Nottingham
 Joseph Masterson – Archbishop of Birmingham
 Philip Pargeter – Auxiliary Bishop in the Archdiocese of Birmingham
 Thomas Leo Parker – Bishop of Northampton
 Joseph Edward Rudderham – Bishop of Clifton
 Phillip Hughes – Noted historian

Politics and Business

 Sir William Patrick Byrne – Senior Civil Servant
 Professor John Clancy - former Leader, Birmingham City Council
 John P. Connolly – Senior Partner, Chief Executive of Deloitte UK
 Paul Goggins – MP for Wythenshawe and Sale East
 José Gutiérrez Guerra – President of Bolivia 1917–1920
 Sir Edward Hulton – newspaper magnate and racehorse breeder
 Derek Page, Baron Whaddon – MP for King's Lynn
 Steven Woolfe – UK Independence Party spokesman, MEP for North West England region & UKIP parliamentary candidate for Stockport

Sportspersons

 Phil Foden – Manchester City footballer
Angus Gunn – Southampton FC
 Jimmy Hogan – footballer and coach
 Will Keane – Wigan Athletic footballer
 Michael Keane – Everton and England footballer
 Neil Mellor – footballer and broadcaster
 Mike Milligan – footballer
 Martin Samuelsen – West Ham United footballer
 Jadon Sancho – Manchester United footballer
 Georgia Stanway — Manchester City, Bayern Munich and England footballer
 Andrew Steele – athlete
 James Trafford – Manchester City and Bolton Wanderers footballer. 
 Keira Walsh — Manchester City, Barcelona and England footballer
 Rob Woolley – first-class cricketer

Miscellaneous

 Major General Joseph Baillon – British Army General
 Lord John Carmont – Senior Scottish High Court Judge
 Sir Ian Kershaw – historian
 Sir John Lyons – linguist and semanticist, Master of Trinity Hall Cambridge
 Steve McGarry – cartoonist, President of National Cartoonists Society
 Bernard O'Donoghue – poet
 Robert Churchhouse - Mathematician

Reports of abuse
In recent years the College has found itself involved in two separate historic abuse investigations; in 2008, a former teacher Father William Green was charged with various counts of indecent assault and indecency with pupils at the school in the 1970s and 1980s. He admitted the offences and was jailed, but has since been released and has now died. The diocese said that it had co-operated with the police and that safeguards against this happening again had long been in place. Then in 2011 the Manchester Evening News published an article concerning Monsignor Thomas Duggan, who had been Rector at the college during the 1950s and 1960s. It alleged mental, physical and sexual abuse of pupils at the college at that time. An attempt was later made by 57 old boys to bring a private prosecution against the school, but the plaintiffs eventually withdrew the case.

See also

Listed buildings in Manchester-M16
Catholic sex abuse cases
For more information about St. Bede's buildings and other developments see Whalley Range.

References

External links
St Bede's College website
Profile on the Independent Schools Council website
Old Bedians Rugby Union Football Club

Private schools in Manchester
Roman Catholic private schools in the Diocese of Salford
 01
Member schools of the Headmasters' and Headmistresses' Conference
Preparatory schools in Greater Manchester
Educational institutions established in 1875
1875 establishments in England
Grade II listed buildings in Manchester
Grade II listed educational buildings